Monroe Bank & Trust was a bank headquartered in Monroe, Michigan, a subsidiary of MBT Financial Corp., a bank holding company. It operated 20 branches, including 14 branches in Monroe County, Michigan and 6 branches in Wayne County, Michigan. In September 2019, the company was acquired by First Merchants Corporation.

History
The bank was founded in 1905 as Monroe State Savings Bank.

In 1940, it acquired Dansard Bank.

In 1950, the bank opened its second location, a branch in Ida, Michigan.

In 1968, the bank changed its name from "Monroe State Savings Bank" to "Monroe Bank & Trust".

In 2001, the bank expanded into Wayne County, Michigan.

In October 2008, the bank acquired Main Street Bank of Northville, Michigan after it suffered from bank failure and was shut by regulators.

In 2009, the bank declined to receive an investment from the United States Department of the Treasury as part of the Troubled Asset Relief Program.

On July 12, 2010, the bank entered into a consent order with the Federal Deposit Insurance Corporation as a result of trouble in its loan portfolio. The consent order was terminated on July 3, 2014.

In June 2016, the company was added to the Russell 3000 Index and Russell 2000 Index.

In September 2019, the company was acquired by First Merchants Corporation.

References

Defunct banks of the United States
American companies established in 1905
Banks established in 1905
Banks disestablished in 2019
2019 mergers and acquisitions
Companies formerly listed on the Nasdaq
1905 establishments in Michigan
2019 disestablishments in Michigan